Fanny Smets (born 21 April 1986) is a Belgian pole vaulter. She competed in the women's pole vault at the 2017 World Championships in Athletics.

International competitions

References

External links
 

1986 births
Living people
Belgian female pole vaulters
World Athletics Championships athletes for Belgium
Place of birth missing (living people)
Belgian Athletics Championships winners
Athletes (track and field) at the 2020 Summer Olympics
Olympic athletes of Belgium
20th-century Belgian women
21st-century Belgian women
Universiade bronze medalists in athletics (track and field)
Universiade bronze medalists for Belgium